The 2017–18 Florida Gulf Coast Eagles men's basketball team represented Florida Gulf Coast University in the 2017–18 NCAA Division I men's basketball season. The Eagles were led by fifth-year head coach Joe Dooley and played their home games at Alico Arena in Fort Myers, Florida as members of the Atlantic Sun Conference. They finished the season 23–12, 12–2 in ASUN play to win the ASUN regular season championship. In the ASUN tournament, they defeated USC Upstate and North Florida to advance to the championship game where they lost to Lipscomb. As a regular season conference champion who failed to win their conference tournament, they received an automatic bid to the National Invitation Tournament where they lost in the first round to Oklahoma State.

On April 4, 2018, head coach Joe Dooley left the school to become the head coach at East Carolina, where he was previously the head coach from 1995 to 1999. The following day, assistant head coach Michael Fly was promoted to head coach.

Previous season 
The Eagles finished the 2016–17 season 26–8, 12–2 in ASUN play to win the regular season championship. As the No. 1 seed in the ASUN tournament, they defeated Stetson, Kennesaw State, and North Florida to win the tournament championship. As a result, they received the conference's automatic bid to the NCAA tournament. As a No. 14 seed in the West region, they lost in the first round to No. 3-seeded Florida State.

Offseason

Departures

Incoming transfers

2017 recruiting class

Roster

Schedule and results 

|-
!colspan=9 style=| Non-conference regular season

|-
!colspan=9 style=| Atlantic Sun Conference regular season

|-
!colspan=12 style=| Atlantic Sun tournament

|-
!colspan=12 style=| NIT

References

Florida Gulf Coast Eagles men's basketball seasons
Florida Gulf Coast
Florida Gulf Coast